Leimiswil is a former municipality in the Oberaargau administrative district in the canton of Bern in Switzerland. On 1 January 2011 Kleindietwil and Leimiswil were merged with the municipality of Madiswil.

Geography
Of this area,  or 75.5% is used for agricultural purposes, while  or 18.7% is forested. Of the rest of the land,  or 5.4% is settled (buildings or roads).

Of the built up area, housing and buildings made up 3.2% and transportation infrastructure made up 1.7%.  17.0% of the total land area is heavily forested and 1.7% is covered with orchards or small clusters of trees.  Of the agricultural land, 37.8% is used for growing crops and 35.5% is pastures, while 2.2% is used for orchards or vine crops.

Demographics
Leimiswil has a population (as of 31 December 2010) of 398. , 1.7% of the population was made up of foreign nationals.  Over the last 10 years the population has decreased at a rate of -9.1%.  Most of the population speaks German  (95.9%), with Albanian being second most common ( 2.0%) and Portuguese being third ( 0.9%).

In the 2007 election the most popular party was the SVP which received 54.5% of the vote.  The next three most popular parties were the FDP (12.5%), the Small right-wing parties (10.4%) and the SPS (10.1%).

The age distribution of the population is children and teenagers (0–19 years old) make up 25.2% of the population, while adults (20–64 years old) make up 59% and the seniors (over 64 years old) make up 15.8%.  The entire Swiss population is generally well educated.  In Leimiswil about 69.5% of the population (between age 25-64) have completed either non-mandatory upper secondary education or additional higher education (either University or a Fachhochschule).

Leimiswil has an unemployment rate of 0.8%.  , there were 97 people employed in the primary economic sector and about 36 businesses involved in this sector.  89 people are employed in the secondary sector and there are 8 businesses in this sector.  50 people are employed in the tertiary sector, with 12 businesses in this sector.

References

External links

 

Former municipalities of the canton of Bern